Under the Whyte notation for the classification of steam locomotives,  represents the wheel arrangement of four leading wheels on two axles, two powered driving wheels on one axle, and four trailing wheels on two axles. This type of locomotive is often called a Huntington type.

Overview
This wheel arrangement was mainly used on various tank locomotive configurations. Eight 4-2-4 well- and back-tank locomotives which entered service on the Bristol and Exeter Railway in 1853 appear to have been the first with this wheel arrangement. The engine was designed by James Pearson, the railway company's engineer, and featured single large flangeless driving wheels between two supporting four-wheeled bogies. The water was carried in both well- and back-tanks, leaving the boilers exposed in the same way as on most tender locomotives.

Usage

United Kingdom
The first eight known 4-2-4T locomotives entered service on the broad gauge Bristol and Exeter Railway in 1853 and 1854, numbered in the range from 39 to 46. They had  diameter flangeless driving wheels, supported by leading and trailing two-axle bogies. The water was carried in both well- and back-tanks. Two more engines were built in 1859 and 1862, but with much smaller  diameter driving wheels.

Between 1869 and 1873, new locomotives were built to replace four of the original  diameter driving wheeled engines, re-using the engine numbers of the locomotives being replaced. These four replacement engines had slightly smaller  diameter driving wheels.

In 1881, this wheel arrangement was also used by the Great Western Railway on William Dean's experimental locomotive no. 9. Since it was so prone to derailing as to be unable to be moved from the workshops where it was built, it did no work and was rebuilt to a  tender locomotive in 1884. Dugald Drummond of the London and South Western Railway built a 4-2-4T F9 class combined locomotive and inspection saloon in 1899. It was little used after Drummond's death in 1912.

United States

The engine C. P. Huntington was one of three identical 4-2-4 tank locomotives. They were the first locomotives to be purchased by Southern Pacific Railroad in 1863, for use on light commuter services in the Sacramento area. The locomotives had serious shortcomings. The single driving axle did not carry the full weight of the engine's rear end due to the trailing truck and, in addition to being too light, it therefore lacked adhesion to reliably pull trains, especially on gradients. The short water tank on the Forney-type frame prevented the locomotives from travelling any moderate distance without consuming all of their water. As a result, these locomotives were only used when absolutely necessary.

In 1863, a sister engine, the T. D. Judah, was built by the Cooke Locomotive Works for a railroad which was unable to pay for it and was purchased by the Central Pacific Railroad. This locomotive was rebuilt to a 4-2-2 wheel arrangement in 1872.

South Africa
In 1923, the South African Railways (SAR) conducted trials with a prototype petrol-paraffin powered road-rail tractor and, in 1924, placed at least two Dutton steam rail tractors in service on the new  narrow gauge line between Naboomspruit and Singlewood in Transvaal. One of the latter had a  wheel arrangement.

The designer, Major Frank Dutton, SAR Signal Engineer and the Motor Transport Superintendent, argued that a rubber tyre in contact with a hard road would be better at transferring tractive power than a steel wheel on steel rail. At least two Dutton Rail Tractors were built, both steam-powered and both rebuilt by the Britannia Engineering Works of Johannesburg from Yorkshire steam tractors.

The second Dutton tractor, no. RR1155, was a rail-only vehicle. It had a bogie at either end with the single pair of driving wheels on a differential axle in the centre. It was arranged for forward and reverse movement at all speeds, but it could only be used on the rails. Since, on occasion, the vehicle had to be transported by road, its construction was such that it could be readily disassembled into more easily transportable units, to be moved on road wheels to a workshop or for transfer of any other kind. In service, the tractor was often equipped with a water tank tender loaded with additional bags of coal on its running boards.

In fiction
The Little Blue Engine from the original 1906 book The Little Engine That Could was a Forney locomotive with this wheel arrangement.

References

 
 
2, 4-2-4T
Whyte notation